Şehzade Mehmed Burhaneddin Efendi (19 December 1885 – 15 June 1949) was a titular King of Albania, an Ottoman prince, son of Sultan Abdul Hamid II and Mezidemestan Kadın.

Early life
Şehzade Mehmed Burhaneddin was born on 19 December 1885 in the Yıldız Palace. His father was Sultan Abdul Hamid II and his mother was Mezidemestan Kadın, daughter of Kaymat Mikanba. He was only the child of his mother. Abdul Hamid named him in the memory of his decreased half-brother, Şehzade Mehmed Burhaneddin.
Burhaneddin's circumcision took place in 1891, together with his half-brothers, Şehzade Mehmed Abdülkadir, and Şehzade Ahmed Nuri.

Career
In June 1890, aged four, Burhaneddin was enlisted in the navy by his father. He was assigned the Ottoman ironclad Orhaniye. In salutations processions, he and Şehzade Ibrahim Tevfik saluted in navy uniforms in front of naval regiment. On 18 June 1893, aged seven, he was given the rank of lieutenant commander. The same year, he composed the naval anthem. On 6 February 1916, during the World War I, he was given the rank of lieutenant commander. On 29 July 1918, he was promoted to the rank of captain.

In 1903, on the visit of Kaiser Wilhelm II's sons Wilhelm, German Crown Prince and Prince Eitel Friedrich of Prussia. Abdul Hamid appointed Burhaneddin, and minister of foreign affairs Tevfik Pasha to welcome the princes. Burhaneddin welcomed the princes and Tevfik performed the duty of translations during the visit. In October 1915, he visited Vienna, and stayed there in Bristol Hotel until the end of 1921.

Personal life
Besides formal education, Burhaneddin was taught music and arts. He played violoncello. For a while he was the favorite son of Abdülhamid II, so much so that was thought the Sultan could circumvent the law and make him crown prince. He had been allocated a villa on the grounds of the Yıldız Palace. He also owned a mansion in Yeniköy.

His first wife was Emine Nurbanu Hidayet Hanım. She was born in 1891. Her father was Prince Mehmed Refik Bey Achba, and her mother was Princess Mahşeref Hanım Emkhaa. A member of the princely Abkhaz family of the Achba, she was related to Esma Cavidan Hanim, consort of Şehzade Yusuf Izzeddin, to Leyla Gülefşan Hanim, lady of the court, Saliha Verdicenan Kadın, consort of Sultan Abdülmejid I, father of Abdülhamid II, and to Pesend Hanim, consort of Abdülhamid II himself. They married on 15 July 1907 in the Yıldız Palace. Soon after the marriage she suffered an abortion. On 26 November 1911, she gave birth to her only child, a son, Şehzade Mehmed Fahreddin in the Nişantaşı Palace. Later divorced, Hidayet died in 1946 in Sivas.

His second wife was Aliye Melek Nazlıyar Hanım. Of Circassian origin, she was born on 13 October 1892 in Istanbul. They married on 7 June 1909 in the Nişantaşı Palace. She was the mother of Ertuğrul Osman born on 18 August 1912, and who served as the Head of House of Osman from 1994 until his death in 2009. They divorced in 1919, after which Nazlıyar married Mehmet Cavit Bey, a finance minister of the Unionists. He was the father of Poet Yalçın. He was executed in 1926, due to his involvement in the İzmir Assassination, which was a failed assassination attempt against Mustafa Kemal Atatürk, 1st President of Turkey. Nazlıyar died on 31 August 1976 in Ankara, Turkey.

His third wife was Georgina Leonora Mosselmans, a Dutch lady. She was born on 23 August 1900 in Bergen op Zoom, Netherlands. They married on 29 April 1925 in Paris, France. The marriage was not recognized by Caliph Abdülmejid II and was annulled the same year. Georgina died in 1969. His fourth and last wife was Elsie Deming Jackson, a wealthy American widow. She was born on 6 September 1879 in New York, and was six years his senior. They married on 3 July 1933 in New York. The marriage was not recognized by Caliph Abdülmejid II. Elsie died at the age of seventy two on 12 May 1952 in New York.

Later life and death
On 27 April 1909, Abdul Hamid was deposed, and sent into exile in Thessaloniki. After Thessaloniki fell to Greece in 1912, Abdul Hamid also returned to Istanbul, and settled in the Beylerbeyi Palace, where he died in 1918. After Abdul Hamid's deposition, he formed close relations from the Unionists that could protect him from the enemy. In 1913, he was offered the Albanian throne, which he repudiated. In 1921, he was also offered the throne of Iraq, but the British opposed this decision. Burhaneddin and his family then settled in Switzerland.

At the exile of imperial family in March 1924, Burhaneddin and his family were already abroad. They settled in Nice and then in Paris. In 1930, Burhaneddin moved to New York. There, as the member of a large oil company, he received salary of $2000 per month. Unlike his siblings, he didn't suffer financial difficulties and poverty. In New York, he lived on the Fifth Avenue, New York's richest neighbourhood.

Mehmed Burhaneddin died on 15 June 1949, due to heart attack at the age of sixty three, in New York. His body was brought to Istanbul, but the government didn't allowed them to enter, after which his body was taken to Syria, where he was buried in the cemetery of the Sulaymaniyya Takiyya, Damascus.

Honours

Ottoman honours
 Order of the House of Osman 
 Order of Glory, Jeweled
 Order of Distinction, Jeweled
 Order of Osmanieh, Jeweled
 Order of Medjidie, Jeweled
 Imtiyaz Medal in Silver; in Gold
 Liakat Medal in Gold
 Hicaz Demiryolu Medal in Gold
 Iftikhar Sanayi Medal in Gold
 Greek War Medal in Gold

Military appointments

Military ranks and naval appointments
 18 June 1893: Lieutenant Commander, Ottoman Navy
 6 February 1916: Commander, Ottoman Navy
 29 July 1918: Captain, Ottoman Navy

Issue

In popular culture
 In the 2017 TV series Payitaht: Abdülhamid, Şehzade Mehmed Burhaneddin is portrayed by Turkish actor Ulaşcan Kutlu.

Ancestry

References

Sources

Ottoman princes
19th-century Ottoman royalty
20th-century Ottoman royalty
1885 births
1949 deaths
Royalty from Istanbul